The Scottish Youth Parliament (SYP) is a youth-led, democratic organisation which aims to represent the young people of Scotland.

The SYP is made up of around 166 democratically-elected representatives aged 14–25 from across Scotland. Representatives are known as Members of the Scottish Youth Parliament (MSYPs). The SYP uses the Scottish Parliamentary constituency structure to elect its members, with elections generally taking place every two years - every constituency area elects two MSYPs using the Single Transferable Vote electoral system. Over 71,000 votes were cast in the 2019 SYP elections.

Around 22 MSYPs represent Voluntary Organisations such as The Boys Brigade, Scouts Scotland, LGBT Youth Scotland and Haggeye instead of constituencies. These MSYPs are directly elected by the Organisations they represent.

The SYP meets three times a year at events called sittings. These usually take place in different Scottish Local Authorities, but have been online since early 2020 due to COVID-19.

The four core values of the SYP are rights, democracy, inclusion and political impartiality. SYP is non-party political, which means MSYPs do not organise themselves along party lines within the Youth Parliament. All MSYPs essentially sit as independents to avoid partisan politics interfering with their representation of young people.

Campaigns 
The SYP campaigns on various issues which affect Scotland's young people.

It has been an advocate for Votes at 16 since its inception in 1999 and has campaigned for it ever since, notably ensuring that Young People aged 16 and 17 could vote in the Referendum on Scottish Independence in 2014.

SYP has campaigned on a range of issues: from its campaign to achieve Equal Marriage – Love Equally - to their Young Carers Campaign – Care. Fair. Share.

SYP's 2017-18 campaign - Right Here Right Now - centred on improving the protection of young people's rights in Scotland, and was successful in securing a commitment from the First Minister, Nicola Sturgeon, that the United Nations Convention on the Rights of the Child (UNCRC) would be incorporated into Scots Law.

The Scottish Youth Parliament's 2018–2019 campaign was "All Aboard", which sought to improve young people's experiences of public transport in Scotland.

At the July 2019 Sitting of the Scottish Youth Parliament, MSYPs choose environmental protection and climate change as their next national campaign. The campaign was named "Pack it Up, Pack it In", and was formally launched in October 2019.

In October 2020, it was decided by the organisation that the next national campaign will focus on a rights-based approach to the COVID-19 Pandemic recovery in Scotland. This campaign was titled 'Bounce Back'.

Governance 
The Board are responsible for the strategic direction of the organisation and are officially the charity's legal custodians.

The charity is supported by a Staff Team of 10.

The current Chief Executive Officer and company general secretary is Ben McKendrick. The current Deputy Chief Executive Officer is Jamie Dunlop. 

As the organisation is youth-led the chair, vice-chair and trustees are young people. They are democratically elected during SYP's Annual General Meeting by the membership of that term. The Current Chair is Sophie Reid MSYP, and the current Vice-Chair is Mollie McGoran MSYP. The board of trustees consists of the Chair, Vice-Chair, and; Crisantos Ike MSYP, Abbie Wright MSYP, Emma Prach MSYP, Gavin Stewart MSYP, Ellie Craig MSYP, and Olivia Brown MSYP.

History 

The group has previously held meetings in the General Assembly Rooms (former temporary home of the Scottish Parliament) in Edinburgh) and also within the new Scottish Parliament building., most recently in 2017.

Partner organisations 
The Scottish Youth Parliament works in partnership with many other organisations, including:

 The Scottish Government
 The Scottish Parliament and its members
 Scottish local authorities
 UK Youth Parliament
 Welsh Youth Parliament
 Children and Young People's Commissioner for Scotland
 YouthLink Scotland
 Young Scot
 Together: The Scottish Alliance for Children's Rights
 Highland Youth Voice
 British Youth Council

Chairs 

The Chair of SYP is elected, usually annually, by MSYPs.

A normal term of service is twelve months, although some Chairs have served for longer periods of time for reasons such as a delay in the SYP elections, and some for shorter periods of time for reasons such as resignation.

The Chair of SYP is a voluntary position and is unpaid.

The Chair convenes and facilitates meetings of the Board and the full Scottish Youth Parliament. They are the primary ambassador of SYP to the public.

There have, to date, been 20 Chairs of SYP since 2000.

Chief Executive Officers

Alumni 
Ross Greer, Green MSP for the West of Scotland and the youngest MSP ever elected to the Scottish Parliament (2016–present), is a former MSYP.

Danielle Rowley, former Labour MP for Midlothian (2017–19), is a former MSYP.

See also 
 Aberdeen City Youth Council
 Community youth development
 Youth politics
 Youth rights
 Welsh Youth Parliament

References

External links 
 

Youth empowerment organizations
1999 establishments in Scotland
Politics of Scotland
Youth organisations based in Scotland
Youth-led organizations
Youth model government
Political organisations based in the United Kingdom